Alfred Harold Wilkinson (31 December 1881 – 4 September 1938) was an Australian rules footballer who played for the Fitzroy Football Club in the Victorian Football League (VFL). He was Fitzroy's leading goalkicker in 1905 with 30 goals for the season.

References
Holmesby, Russell & Main, Jim (2009). The Encyclopedia of AFL Footballers. 8th ed. Melbourne: Bas Publishing.

External links

1881 births
1938 deaths
Australian rules footballers from Victoria (Australia)
Australian Rules footballers: place kick exponents
Fitzroy Football Club players
Fitzroy Football Club Premiership players
One-time VFL/AFL Premiership players